Mother Goose Goes Hollywood is a 1938 animated short film produced by Walt Disney Productions and distributed by RKO Radio Pictures. The short was released on December 23, 1938. The film parodies several Mother Goose nursery rhymes using caricatures of popular Hollywood film stars of the 1930s. The film was directed by Wilfred Jackson and was the third-to-last Silly Symphony produced.

Plot
This cartoon short depicts a series of sketches showing popular Hollywood stars of the day acting out traditional nursery rhymes.

Old King Cole is (Hugh Herbert) and his three fiddlers are (The Marx Brothers) and a special guest of Donald Duck.

Rub-a-dub-dub is portrayed with Charles Laughton, Spencer Tracy and Freddie Bartholomew.

W. C. Fields plays Humpty Dumpty with special guest Charlie McCarthy.

Stan Laurel and Oliver Hardy play Simple Simon and the pieman.

See Saw Margery Daw is performed by Edward G. Robinson and Greta Garbo on a seesaw.

Eddie Cantor is Little Jack Horner in a big musical sequence featuring Cab Calloway, Fats Waller, and Stepin Fetchit as singing crows. Others who appear are Clark Gable, Martha Raye, Fred Astaire, Joe E. Brown and Alice Faye.

In a running gag, Katharine Hepburn appears at various points as Little Bo Peep.

Reception

On July 2, 1938, Variety said, "Mother Goose Goes Hollywood. Also haywire. She thinks she is Leo the Lion and opens the picture with that Metro college yell, three leonine rahs. So in angles Katharine Hepburn Bo Peep with a Back Bay accent. She has lost her sheep on account of she looks hungry enough to eat a flock of mutton. While she is paging her sheep, up pops Hugh Herbert who looks more like a roast beef. He is dressed up like Old King Cole and calls for fiddlers three but all he gets is the Ritz Brothers... This is a preview of Mother Goose Goes Hollywood at the Pantages last night, and if you think the previewer is crazy, go and look at it yourself. A Walt Disney production for RKO-Radio release. Running time not long enough."

Since the 1960s, this cartoon has not been broadcast very often on television, due to the stereotypical depictions of black people in some scenes. Sometimes it has been broadcast minus the scenes with African Americans but as animation critic Charles Solomon noted in his book, Enchanted Drawings: History of Animation, that the caricatures of Fats Waller and Cab Calloway don't poke fun at their race, and are treated just as good or bad like the other caricatured celebrities spoofed in this cartoon.

Voice cast
 The Blackbirds: Cab Calloway
 Dave Weber: Eddie Cantor, Charlie McCarthy, Joe Penner, Edward G. Robinson
 Clarence Nash: Donald Duck
 Thelma Boardman: Freddie Bartholemew
 Ann Lee: Martha Raye
 Sara Berner: Greta Garbo, Katharine Hepburn
 Al Bernie: Charles Laughton, W.C. Fields, Laurel and Hardy

Home media
The short was released on December 19, 2006 on Walt Disney Treasures: More Silly Symphonies, Volume Two.

See also

 Mickey's Gala Premiere
 Mickey's Polo Team
 The Autograph Hound
 Hollywood Steps Out
 Slick Hare
 Hollywood Daffy
 Felix in Hollywood

References

External links
Disney Shorts

1938 films
1938 short films
Donald Duck short films
1930s Disney animated short films
Films directed by Wilfred Jackson
Films produced by Walt Disney
Silly Symphonies
Hollywood, Los Angeles in fiction
1938 animated films
Works based on nursery rhymes
Films about actors
Films based on nursery rhymes
Cultural depictions of W. C. Fields
Cultural depictions of Fats Waller
Cultural depictions of Cab Calloway
Cultural depictions of Laurel & Hardy
Cultural depictions of the Marx Brothers
Cultural depictions of Fred Astaire
Cultural depictions of Clark Gable
Cultural depictions of Greta Garbo
Cultural depictions of Edward G. Robinson
Cultural depictions of Katharine Hepburn
Animation based on real people
1930s American films